Shrewsbury High School is a private day school for girls from ages 4 – 18 Shrewsbury, Shropshire, England. It is an original member school of the Girls' Day School Trust.

History
Shrewsbury High School opened as a day school for girls in 1885. In 1893 the rising star Ethel Gavin took over as head. The school had outgrown its site and it moved to its present location on the banks of the River Severn in central Shrewsbury in 1895. Gavin moved on to another headship in 1897. The junior department transferred to Kennedy Road in 1959. In 2008 a new prep school was formed by the merger of the existing junior department with Kingsland Grange, a boys’ prep school. The Junior Department has now moved to the historic Town Walls campus as an all-through all-girls school from 4-18.

The Senior Department is located on Town Walls, by the banks of the River Severn.

Houses
Shrewsbury High School Senior Department has four houses, each named after an ancient male Roman deity.
Apollo Yellow 
Neptune Blue
Mercury Red
Jupiter Green

Following its success in the senior school, the House system was introduced to the junior school in September 2005 when Mrs Edwards joined Shrewsbury High School Junior Department as its Head. The Junior Department also has four houses, named after hills in Shropshire.

Wenlock 
Long Mynd 
Stretton 
Haughmond 

There are many house competitions that take place each term such as sports day, house drama and house charity events. Siblings are usually put into the same house. There are House Captains, Deputy House Captains and House Prefects of each of the four houses and also a Head Girl and a Deputy Head Girl. In the senior school these roles are taken by Sixth Formers.

Notable former pupils

 Lois Baxter, actress
 Mary Beard, classicist
Alice Bunn, Director of UK Space Agency
 Hilda Murrell, naturalist

Notes and references

External links
School Website
Profile on MyDaughter
ISI Inspection Report

Girls' schools in Shropshire
Schools in Shrewsbury
Schools of the Girls' Day School Trust
Member schools of the Girls' Schools Association
Private schools in Shropshire
Educational institutions established in 1885
1885 establishments in England